The 1962 Titleholders Championship was the 23rd Titleholders Championship, held April 26–30 at Augusta Country Club in Augusta, Georgia. Defending champion Mickey Wright sank a ten-foot (3 m) putt for par on the 72nd hole to tie Ruth Jessen and force the first playoff in the event's history.

Wright won the 18-hole playoff by three strokes, 69 to 72, to repeat as champion.

Barbara Romack held a five-shot lead after 36 holes, but finished two strokes back in solo third.

Final leaderboard
Sunday, April 29, 1962

Source:

Playoff
Monday, April 30, 1962

Source:

References

Titleholders Championship
Golf in Georgia (U.S. state)
Titleholders Championship
Titleholders Championship
Titleholders Championship
Titleholders Championship
Women's sports in Georgia (U.S. state)